Acetone were an American alternative rock band formed in 1992 in Los Angeles, California, United States, from the three core members of the group Spinout, formed in 1987. The group consisted of Mark Lightcap on guitar, Richie Lee on bass and Steve Hadley on drums. It disbanded after Lee committed suicide on July 23, 2001, aged 34. 

The group's influences included The Beach Boys, Gram Parsons and the Velvet Underground. Establishing themselves as an alternative rock group, they incorporated genres ranging from neo-psychedelia to roots rock and country into their music.

Acetone has performed on few occasions since Lee's death, most notably with Mazzy Star's lead singer Hope Sandoval in 2017.

Member activity outside of Acetone 
Hadley and Lightcap formed The Ecstasy of Gold in 2012, releasing their first album Vol. 1 October 6, 2022.

Lightcap's endeavors include the Dick Slessig Combo, with himself on guitar, bassist Carl Bronson, and drummer Steve Goodfriend formerly of the band Radar Brothers. Notable credits include electronic duo Matmos' albums The West (1999), A Chance to Cut Is a Chance to Cure (2001), The Civil War (2003),The Rose Has Teeth in the Mouth of a Beast (2006), performing electric, slide and acoustic guitar, ukulele, banjo, tuba, trumpet, bass trumpet, peck horn, and plastic tube.

Albums
 Acetone (EP) (1993) (Vernon Yard Records)
 Cindy (1993) (Vernon Yard Records)
 I Guess I Would (1995) (Virgin Records)
 If You Only Knew (1996) (Vernon Yard)
 Acetone (1997) (Vapor Records)
 York Blvd. (2000) (Vapor Records)
 Acetone 1992–2001 (Compilation) (2017) (Light in the Attic Records)

Band members
 Richie Lee – bass guitar, vocals
 Mark Lightcap – guitar, vocals
 Steve Hadley – drums

References

External links
 Acetone Page / Light in the Attic Records

Musical groups from Los Angeles
Alternative rock groups from California